The 2012–13 Regional Super50 is the domestic one-day cricket competition in the West Indies. This edition of the Regional Super50 tournament will feature the six permanent first-class regions of the West Indies along with the Combined Campuses and Colleges team. The tournament will consist of a round-robin group stage followed by two semi-final matches for the top four finishers with the winners advancing to the final.

Table

Group stage

Semi finals

Final

Domestic cricket competitions in 2012–13
2012–13 West Indian cricket season
2013 in West Indian cricket
Regional Super50 seasons